Aradan (also Romanized as Ārādān) is a village in Maspi Rural District, in the Central District of Abdanan County, Ilam Province, Iran. At the 2006 census, its population was 44, in 10 families.

References 

Populated places in Abdanan County